Obersee Nachrichten, commonly shortened to ON, is a Swiss German-language weekly newspaper, published in Rapperswil.

History and profile 
Obersee Nachrichten was founded by the publisher Bruno Hug. The first issue was published on 20 June 1981. By the end of 1999, Obersee Nachrichten AG was sold to the Mediengruppe West Schweiz AG, headquartered in Chur. The staff comprises 12 employees in five (500%) full-time jobs, as well as employees comprising the newspaper prepress (Südostschweiz, Glarus) and the print shop (Südostschweiz Partner AG, Haag). The newspaper is still run by Bruno Hug as the publisher. The publishing company is based in Rapperswil.

Obersee Nachrichten (literally: Upper Lake Zürich Newspaper) claims to be the "largest and most widely read newspaper in the greater region of the Obersee lake shore." The newspaper is distributed between Rapperswil-Jona (canton of St. Gallen), Rüti ZH towards the Ricken Pass, and between Wollerau (canton of Schwyz) and Glarnerland. The newspaper is published every Thursday, 52 times a year, reaching a circulation of 68,822 (WEMF-authenticated) and 82,000 regular readers (MACH-based). There is free distribution to all households in the distribution area.

See also
 Zürichsee-Zeitung

References

External links
  

1981 establishments in Switzerland
Daily newspapers published in Switzerland
Free daily newspapers
German-language newspapers published in Switzerland
Mass media in St. Gallen (city)
Newspapers established in 1981
Newspapers published in Zürich
Rapperswil-Jona